Aeluroidea is an extant clade of feline-like carnivores that are, or were, endemic to North America, South America, Africa, and Asia.

Taxonomy
Aeluroidea was named by William Henry Flower in 1869. It was assigned to Carnivora by Flower (1883) and Carroll (1988); and to Feliformia by Bryant (1991).

References

Extant Oligocene first appearances